Luwu Regency (Kabupaten Luwu in Indonesian) is a regency of South Sulawesi Province, Indonesia. The administrative capital now lies at Belopa, since the former capital (Palopo) became an independent municipality (city) in 2006, at which date the then existing Luwu Regency was split into four entities - Palopo city, North Luwu Regency, East Luwu Regency, and the residual Luwu Regency. The regency now covers 2,909.08 km2 and had a population of 287,472 at the 2010 census and 365,608 at the 2020 census. The official estimate as at mid 2021 was 367,454.

The first regent of the reduced Luwu Regency was H. M. Basmin Mattayang from 2004 to 2009, then Ir. H. Andi Mudzakkar replaced him as regent from 2009 to 2014 following the first direct election in Luwu. Luwu is well known for its natural resources, such as rice, cocoa, coconut, banana, sagu (sago), rambutan, langsat, and others.

History 
Luwu is named after the Luwu Kingdom, one of the three biggest kingdoms (and the oldest one) in South Sulawesi; the other two kingdoms were Gowa-Tallo (which became Gowa Regency and Makassar) and Bone (which became Bone Regency). The name "Luwu" had been known from the 13th century when the first king of the Lontara period of Luwu was throned. In Luwu history, there are two periods; the Galigo period and the Lontara period.

The Galigo period is matched from La Galigo or I La Galigo (an ancient literature, the longest epic in the world) which founded by B.F. Matthes in 1888. By R.A. Kern, a Dutch historian, the Galigo period is described as pre-historic time. The other historians said Galigo as pseudo-history. In I La Galigo, there are three places that said; Wara, Luwu, and Wewangriu that always said as Tompotikka.

Sanusi Daeng Mattata, author of Luwu dalam Revolusi, said that Luwu word is taken from riulo which means divine extended from above. This name is related to oral tradition that sacred in Luwu. In that oral tradition said that this world is divinely extended from sky, paved, then blessed by abundant natural resources.

The origin of Luwu name is taken from other words too; malucca (Bugis Ware' Language) and malutu (Palili' Language) which both mean turbid or dark. Turbid means always full with contents like river color when flooded. Dark interpreted as forest and sago near to the beach. Then malucca and malutu become malu and then becomes luwu.

C. Salombe in his book said that word 'Lu' in Luwu is taken from 'lau' word means sea or East. Salombe said Toraja is the way of Luwu people call the people who live in mountain or West. To Raja or To Riaja means people on the highland or people in the West. Luwu or Lu is the way of Toraja people call the people who live in beach or East or lowland.

Geographic condition 
Geographically, Luwu Regency is located between 2°3’45” and 3°37’30” South Latitude and between 119°15” and 121°43’11” West Longitude.
Administrative borders are:

Luwu Regency is split into two separate areas by the city of Palopo in the middle. The northern area comprises the six districts of Walenrang, Walenrang Timur (East Walenrang), Lamasi, Walenrang Utara (North Walenrang), Walenrang Barat (West Walenrang) and Lamasi Timur (East Lamasi) districts - or Walenrang and Lamasi (abbreviated as "Walmas"). The southern area comprises the remaining sixteen districts tabulated below.

Climate
Luwu regency has a tropical rainforest climate (Af) with heavy to very heavy rainfall year-round. The following climate data is for the town of Belopa, the seat of the regency.

Administration 
Luwu Regency in 2010 comprised 21 administrative districts (Kecamatan), but an additional district (Bassesangtempe Utara) was subsequently created from part of Bassesangtempe District. The 22 districts are tabulated below with their populations at the 2010 census  and the 2020 census, together with the official estimates as at mid 2021. The table also includes the number of villages (desa and kelurahan) in each district, and its post code.

Note: (a) the 2010 population of the new Bassesangtempe Utara District was included in the 2010 total of Bassesangtempe District.

Some 1,000 protesters recently expressed their anger that the House of Representatives did not include the requested Central Luwu Regency, which they wanted to be separated from Luwu Regency, in the planned creation of 65 new regencies and autonomous cities, on 24 October 2014. These local residents believed Central Luwu was ready to become a separate regency. There are six districts in the planned regency: Walenrang, East Walenrang, West Walenrang, North Walenrang, Lamasi and East Lamasi with a combined area of 714.29 km2 and a total population of 91,885 in 2010 and 97,643 in mid 2021.

Natural resources and culinary 
The most known culinary in Luwu is kepurung (kapurung, pugalu, bugalu, kapeda) which is made from sago plant (Metroxylon sagu). There is dange which is made from sago too. The other culinary is pacco and bagea.
Luwu is known as a fruit producer, such as durian, langsat (Lansium parasiticum), rambutan, and many others.

Culture 
Luwu is the origin of the longest epic in the world, La Galigo that created before Mahabharata. Some manuscript of I La Galigo is saved in European Museums, like in Leiden University Library. I La Galigo manuscript is the story about Sawerigading and known well in Central Sulawesi, Southeast Sulawesi, Gorontalo, and through Malaysia.
On May 25, 2011, La Galigo manuscript in Leiden University Library was inscribed in UNESCO's Memory of the World Register affirming its world significance and outstanding universal value.

References 

Luwu Regency
Regencies of South Sulawesi